Sebastián Lasave (born 10 June 1971) is an Argentine backstroke and freestyle swimmer. He competed in two events at the 1992 Summer Olympics.

References

External links
 

1971 births
Living people
Argentine male backstroke swimmers
Argentine male freestyle swimmers
Olympic swimmers of Argentina
Swimmers at the 1992 Summer Olympics
Place of birth missing (living people)
20th-century Argentine people